Chiliss were an ancient people from the Indus Valley in the Hindu Kush, Khyber Pakhtunkhwa, Pakistan. Chiliss were, according to their tradition, originally from Boneyr.

References

Hindu Kush
Social groups of Pakistan
Ancient history of Afghanistan
Ancient peoples of Pakistan